The Source is a public art work by artist Sorel Etrog located at the Lynden Sculpture Garden near Milwaukee, Wisconsin. The sculpture's abstract form is horizontally oriented; it is installed on the lawn.

References

Outdoor sculptures in Milwaukee
1964 sculptures
Bronze sculptures in Wisconsin
Abstract sculptures in Wisconsin
1960s establishments in Wisconsin